Seto Digital Tower is a 244.7 m 803 ft tall digital broadcasting tower in Seto, Aichi, Japan. In 2011, the tower replaced the Nagoya TV Tower; the Nagoya TV Tower previously had the role of broadcasting in the Nagoya area. The tower is of a unique design not know to have been used elsewhere before. Six outer steel legs provide support and structural stability to a central lattice structure akin to those found in guyed lattice masts.

See also 
Lattice tower

References

 File:Seto Digital Tower.jpg - Wikimedia Commons

External links 
 

Buildings and structures in Aichi Prefecture
Communication towers in Japan
Radio masts and towers
Towers completed in 2011
2011 establishments in Japan
Seto, Aichi